The Germanic god Thor (Old Norse: Þórr) is referred to by many names in Old Norse poetry and literature. Some of the names come from the Prose Edda list Nafnaþulur, and are not attested elsewhere, while other names are well attested throughout the sources of Norse mythology.

Names

See also
List of names of Odin
List of names of Freyr
List of kennings

Notes

References 

 Simek, Rudolf (2007) translated by Angela Hall. Dictionary of Northern Mythology. D.S. Brewer.  (Translation of Lexikon der germanischen Mythologie 1984)
 Snorri Sturluson (1879) ed. Rasmus B. Anderson. The Prose Edda: Norse Mythology Digital reissue Digireads.com (2009)  
 Snorri Sturluson (1960) translated and ed. Arthur Gilchrist Brodeur. The Prose Edda. The American-Scandinavian Foundation.
 Turville-Petre, E.O.G. (1964). Myth and Religion of the North: The Religion of Ancient Scandinavia. Weidenfeld & Nicolson. 
 de Vries, Jan (1970). Altgermanische Religionsgeschichte. Volume 2, 3rd ed., unchanged reissue of revised ed. (1957). Walter de Gruyter.

Thor, names of
Thor